Felani Khatun was a 15-year-old Bangladeshi girl who was shot and killed by Indian Border Security Force (BSF) on 7 January 2011, along the India-Bangladesh border. 
A photograph showing Felani Khatun's dead body hanging
on a border fence made of barbed wire was picked up by international media, and the publication of these photographs evoked  international concern. The photo had created an "uproar" in Bangladesh. After a lot of back and forth between different courts within India, the case is still pending for final judgement as (MSM) a human rights activist platform in India has launch a petition in the country's Supreme Court seeking justice and compensation for the killing of Felani Khatun. Lawyer and Human Rights Activist SM Abraham Lincoln who has been the lawyer for Felani Khatun's Family on Bangladesh's side for the last 11 years, believes that after the covid 19 pandemic the process has lost momentum. This Case is significant before of the international attention that it gather and also paints a vivid picture the length of struggle that people living in borderline Bangladesh and India have to go through.

See also
Deaths along the Bangladesh–India border
Murder of Nusrat Jahan Rafi
Murder of Sohagi Jahan Tonu
Murder of Abrar Fahad

References

Central Armed Police Forces of India
Deaths by person in Bangladesh
Extrajudicial killings
Bangladesh–India border
2011 in Bangladesh
2011 in India
January 2011 events in India 
January 2011 events in Bangladesh 
2011 crimes in India
2011 crimes in Bangladesh